The Voice Portugal (A Voz de Portugal in the first season) is a Portuguese reality singing competition and local version of The Voice, originally broadcast as The Voice of Holland. It premiered on 29 October 2011, on RTP1, with the first-season finale airing on 25 February 2012, crowning Denis Filipe as the winner. The show came back in 2014 with its second season with new coaches, a new co-host, a new show name, and new Repórteres V (backstage hosts). The winner of the second season was Rui Drumond. RTP1 later announced the first season of The Voice Kids and the third season of the main show. The third season premiered on 11 October 2015 with a new coach, Aurea. In its third season, the show proved to be a hit and was subsequently renewed for a fourth season, which was premiered in 2016.

The series employs a panel of four coaches who critique the artists' performances. Each coach guides their teams of selected artists through the remainder of the season. They also compete to ensure that their act wins the competition, thus making them the winning coach. The original coaching panel consisted of Rui Reininho, Paulo Gonzo, Mia Rose, and the duo Anjos. In 2014 when the show came back, Reininho returned as a coach and was joined by Mickael Carreira, Marisa Liz, and Anselmo Ralph. Also in 2014, Ralph became one of the coaches of the kids' version, alongside Daniela Mercury and Raquel Tavares. In the third season, Reininho left and was replaced by Aurea. In the seventh season Carreira and Ralph were replaced by Diogo Piçarra and António Zambujo. In the tenth season Aurea and Zambujo were replaced by Carolina Deslandes and Dino d'Santiago.

The show is hosted by Catarina Furtado and in the second season, Vasco Palmeirim and Furtado became co-hosts. The kids version was hosted by Palmeirim and Mariana Monteiro, who was a Repórter V for the second season of the main series. The show also features backstage hosts (Repórteres V). Diogo Beja was the first Repórter V back in 2011, being replaced in the second season by Laura Figueiredo, Mariana Monteiro, and Pedro Fernandes. In the third season, Jani Gabriel became the only Repórter V. During the kids' season, Rui Maria Pêgo was the backstage host.

Concept 

Each season begins with the "Blind Auditions", where coaches form their team of artists whom they mentor through the remainder of the season. The coaches' chairs are faced toward the audience during artists' performances; those interested in an artist press their button, which turns their chair towards the artist and illuminates the bottom of the chair to read "I want you." After the performance, an artist either defaults to the only coach who turned around or selects his or her coach if more than one coach expresses interest.

In the Battles round (Batalhas), each coach pairs two of his or her team members to perform together and then chooses one to advance in the competition. A new element was added in season two; coaches were given two "steals", allowing each coach to select two individuals who were eliminated during a battle round by another coach.

The Knockouts round (Tira-Teimas) was introduced in season two. A pair of artists within a team are selected to go directly to the live shows without performing and the other four pairs from each team will have to perform, and only six (including the pair that went directly to the live shows) will go to the live shows.

In the final live performance phase of the competition, artists perform against each other. People's votes help decide who stays on the show and who leaves.

Timeline of coaches and hosts

Coaches' teams and their artists 
 These are each of the coaches' teams throughout the seasons' live shows. Winners are in bold and finalists in italic.

Series overview
Warning: the following table presents a significant amount of different colors.

Seasons' synopses

Season 1 (2011–2012) 

The first season, under the A Voz de Portugal, was hosted by Catarina Furtado, and the four coaches were singer-songwriter Paulo Gonzo, pop rock duo Anjos, YouTube sensation Mia Rose, and GNR lead vocalist Rui Reininho.

Season 2 (2014) 
The second season of The Voice Portugal was hosted by Catarina Furtado and Vasco Palmeirim. Reininho returned as coach alongside new coaches Mickael Carreira, Amor Electro vocalist Marisa Liz, and Anselmo Ralph. The knockouts round was introduced during this season.

Season 3 (2015–2016) 
The third season of The Voice Portugal began in October 2015. All panelists from last season returned except Reininho, who was replaced by a new coach, Aurea.

Season 4 (2016) 
The fourth season was announced at the end of the third season in October 2016. The hosts and the four coaches remained the same.

Season 5 (2017) 
The fifth season of The Voice Portugal began in September 2017. All panelists from last season returned.

Season 6 (2018) 
The sixth season of The Voice Portugal began in September 2018 with the same panelists as last season. In this season there were five finalists, one per team and one voted by the public after being eliminated in the semi-final.

Season 7 (2019–2020) 
The seventh season of The Voice Portugal began on 13 October 2019. Liz and Aurea remained as coaches, alongside debutants Diogo Piçarra and António Zambujo, who replaced Carreira and Ralph. From this season on, bands can participate. For the first time in the competition, the knockouts phase was live with public voting, instead of being pre-recorded.

Season 8 (2020–2021) 
The eighth season of The Voice Portugal began on 27 September 2020. Liz, Aurea, Piçarra, and Zambujo remained as coaches. For the first time in the competition, in the battles phase, each artist sang a different song instead of singing one together, probably due to the procedures of the COVID-19 pandemic in Portugal. This season marks the first stolen artist to win The Voice Portugal.

Season 9 (2021–2022) 
The ninth season of The Voice Portugal began on 17 October 2021. Aurea, Liz, Piçarra, and Zambujo remained as coaches.

Season 10 (2022–2023) 
The tenth season of The Voice Portugal began recording on 5 September, with the confirmation that Liz and Piçarra would return as coaches, while Aurea and Zambujo were replaced by The Voice Kids coach Carolina Deslandes and new coach Dino d'Santiago. The season began airing on 25 September 2022.

This season, a new dynamic to the battles was introduced: each coach could decide to do battles in pairs or groups, and the only rule was they needed to keep only seven artists on their teams. Hence, a battle could have one, many, or no winners. Also, the steals were removed. New this season, the "Cross Battles" were introduced. Its mechanic is: an artist of one team competes against an artist of another team and the public vote decides the winner of the battle. At the end of the round, each coach saved one eliminated artist from their own team.

The dynamic of the lives shows changed this season. Starting in the fourth live show (when the Top 10 artists remain in competition), the decision of who passes through to the next episode is solely of the public. The coaches are unable to save an artist to move through, and, also, the artists that receive the most public votes, regardless of team, advance to the next episode. This means that for the first time ever in The Voice Portugal, a coach could have not had their team represented in the finale, which eventually did not happen. Also, contrary to the previous four seasons, there were only four finalists.

Ratings

The Voice Gerações 
In 2022, it was announced that RTP1 would broadcast a new version of The Voice. This new version is called The Voice Gerações, where groups of friends and/or families of different generations compete. On 3 July, the coaches for this version were announced to be Carreira, Ralph, Bárbara Bandeira, and Simone de Oliveira. The first series was won by Rodrigo & Teresa from Team Anselmo.

Seasons' summary

Season 1 (2022)

References

External links

The Voice Portugal
Portuguese-language television shows
2011 Portuguese television series debuts
2012 Portuguese television series endings
2010s Portuguese television series